Anema is a genus of lichen within the family Lichinaceae. The genus contains at least 13 species.

Species
Species names associated at some time with Anema are as follows: 
Anema asahinae
Anema botryosum
Anema botyosum
Anema bullatum
Anema camaromorpha
Anema cernohorskyi
Anema decipiens
Anema diffusum
Anema dodgei
Anema exiguum
Anema jenisejense
Anema jenisejensis
Anema latissimum
Anema moedlingense
Anema nodulosum
Anema notarisii
Anema nummulariellum
Anema nummularium
Anema plicatissimum
Anema prodigula
Anema prodigulum
Anema suffruticosum
Anema tumidulum
Anema veronense
Anema veronensis

References

External links
Anema at Index Fungorum

Lichinomycetes
Lichen genera
Taxa named by William Nylander (botanist)